Eurata sericaria is a moth of the subfamily Arctiinae. It was described by Perty in 1834. It is found in Minas Gerais, Brazil.

References

Arctiinae
Moths described in 1834